About Religion was a UK religious affairs programme on Associated Television (ATV) 1958–1965. It was usually hosted by interviewer Julian Grenfell, with David King and John Brooking. An anthology of interviews was published in 1963.

References

British religious television series